Santa Cruz da Baixa Verde is a city  in the state of Pernambuco, Brazil. The population in 2020, according with IBGE was 12,650 inhabitants and the total area is 114.93 km².

Geography

 State - Pernambuco
 Region - Sertão Pernambucano
 Boundaries - Paraiba state    (N);  Serra Talhada and Calumbi   (S);  Triunfo   (E);   Serra Talhada   (W).
 Area - 114.93 km²
 Elevation - 850 m
 Hydrography - Pajeú River
 Vegetation - Subcaducifólia forest
 Climate - Mediterranean climate
 Annual average temperature - 21.9 c
 Distance to Recife - 437 km

Economy

The main economic activities in Santa Cruz da Baixa Verde are based in commerce and agribusiness, especially creation of cattle, sheep, goats, pigs, chickens;  and plantations of sugarcane and  beans.

Economic Indicators

Economy by Sector
2006

Health Indicators

References

Municipalities in Pernambuco